Andrei Vladimirovich Spiridonov (born 21 May 1982) is a Kazakhstani professional ice hockey player. He is currently playing with the HK Almaty of the Kazakhstan Hockey Championship.

He previously played for Barys Astana of the Kontinental Hockey League (KHL).

International
He participated at the 2010 IIHF World Championship as a member of the Kazakhstan men's national ice hockey team.

Spiridonov was named to the Kazakhstan men's national ice hockey team for competition at the 2014 IIHF World Championship.

References

External links

1982 births
Living people
Barys Nur-Sultan players
Beibarys Atyrau players
HC Almaty players
Kazakhstani ice hockey centres
Kazakhstani people of Russian descent
Sportspeople from Oskemen